The Ağrı Province is a province in eastern Turkey, bordering Iran to the east, Kars to the north, Erzurum to the northwest, Muş and Bitlis to the southwest, Van to the south, and Iğdır to the northeast. It has an area of 11,376 km² and a population of 535,435 as of 2020. Doğubayazıt was the capital of the province until 1946. The current governor is Süleyman Elban.

The province is considered part of Western Armenia by Armenians and was part of the ancient province of Ayrarat of Kingdom of Armenia. Before the Armenian genocide, modern Ağri Province was part of the six Armenian vilayets. The province is considered part of Turkish Kurdistan and has a Kurdish majority.

Districts

Ağrı province is divided into eight districts (capital district in bold):
 Ağrı
 Diyadin
 Doğubayazıt
 Eleşkirt
 Hamur
 Patnos
 Taşlıçay
 Tutak

Geography
It can be climbed from here and can be seen from parts of Azerbaijan, Iran, Georgia, and Armenia. The nearest town to the mountain is Doğubayazıt.

46% of the province is mountainous, 29% is plain, 18% is plateau, and 7% high meadow. As well as Ararat there are many other peaks over 3,000m, including Aladağlar and Tendürek. The plains are fertile, being covered in volcanic deposits, and are used for growing grains and grazing. Various tributaries of the Murat River (which later feeds the Euphrates) flow through the area and water these plains. The high meadows are used for grazing.

The weather here is very cold (temperatures as low as -10°C (14°F) in winter) and the mountainsides are mainly bare. There are a number of important passes and routes through the mountains.

History

The plateau of Ağrı was controlled by the Kingdom of Urartu until its transition to the Kingdom of Armenia. The area was coveted by many as a gateway between east and west.  It was conquered numerous times by Assyrians, Greeks, Romans, Byzantines, Arabs, Georgians, Mongols, Persians, and finally by the Seljuq and Ottoman Turks.

The first Muslims in the area were the Abbasids in 872. The Turkish tribes began to pass through in huge numbers following the defeat of the Byzantine armies at Malazgirt in 1071, sometimes pursued by Mongols. The land was brought into the Ottoman Empire by Sultan Selim I following the Battle of Chaldiran. The region was part of the Erzurum Vilayet during the Ottoman Empire.

Inspectorates-General 
In the late 1920s, in an attempt to curb the Ararat rebellion, the province was included into the First Inspectorate-General comprising the provinces of Mardin, Diyarbakır, Van, Elazıĝ, Bitlis, Hakkari, Şanlıurfa and Siirt.

In September 1935 the province was transferred into the third Inspectorate General (Umumi Müfettişlik, UM). The third UM span over the provinces of Erzurum, Artvin, Rize, Trabzon, Kars Gümüşhane, Erzincan and Ağrı. It was governed by a Inspector General seated in the city of Erzurum.  The Inspectorate General was dissolved in 1952 during the Government of the Democrat Party.

Recent events

On August 19, 2006, the Tabriz–Ankara gas pipeline exploded in the province. Turkish authorities suspect Kurdish rebels were behind the incident.

Ağrı today
The economy is mainly agricultural. People also live by breeding animals. Ağrı attracts tourists to the mountains, for climbing and trekking in summers, and skiing in winters. Places of interest include: 
 Ishak Pasha Palace in Doğubayazıt
 Mount Tendürek in Doğubayazıt with what some claim to be the second-largest meteor crater in the world
 Aznavur Tepe in Patnos
 The tomb of Ahmedi Hani, who wrote the Kurdish epic Mem and Zin

Demographics

References

External links 
 The provincial governorate
 Ağrı weather forecast information 

 
Provinces of Turkey
Turkish Kurdistan